Dorcadion haemorrhoidale is a species of beetle in the family Cerambycidae. It was described by Hampe in 1852. It is known from Turkey, Armenia and Iran.

References

haemorrhoidale
Beetles described in 1852